Tanggamus Regency is a regency (kabupaten) of Lampung Province, Sumatra, Indonesia. It has an area of 4,654.96 km² and had a population of 534,595 at the 2010 Census and 640,275 at the 2020 Census; the official estimate as at mid 2021 was 645,807. The regency seat is the town of Kota Agung Pusat. The regency was created on 21 March 1997, but districts in its eastern part were split away in 2008 to form a new Pringsewu Regency. It lies in the southwest of the province, and surrounds Semangka Bay (Teluk Semangka) on its west, north and east coasts.

Administrative districts
Tanggamus Regency is divided into twenty administrative districts (kecamatan), tabulated below with their areas and their populations at the 2010 Census and the 2020 Census, together with the official estimates as at mid 2021. The table also includes the locations of the district administrative centres, the number of villages (rural desa and urban kelurahan) in each district, and its post code.

Notes: (a) includes the substantial island of Pulau Tabuan in the southern entrance to Semangka Bay, and three small offshore islands (Pulau Batucentigi, Pulau Batuputih and Pulau Karangputih). (b) includes 25 small offshore islands. (c) includes the small offshore island of Pulau Batukerbau.

History
In the winter of 2009/2010, the regency suffered from flooding, which saw some 80 percent of the forest in Tanggamus severely damaged. Landslides occurred in the district of Semaka and the flooding drowned several elephants including one within the protected Bukit Barisan Selatan National Park and another at the Way Kerap Dam in Tanggamus.

Bukit Barisan Selatan National Park is a National Park Sumatra in Liwa. Tropical Forest World Heritage Site Bukit Barisan with a total area of 3,568 km2 stretches from the slopes of Mount Pesagi West Lampung Regency, Pesisir Barat Regency, Bengkulu, Padang, Padang Sidenpuan, Medan to Aceh Coastal Asian Continent. Spread of Islam in Lampung from Pasai was brought by the descendants or the Sultan Sekala Brak Yang Dipertuan Ke-23, blood that dripped from Sultan Ratu Buay Pernong the establishment of the kingdom Islam, the Kepaksian Paksi Pak Sekala Brak on the slope Mount Pesagi Batu Brak in 688 Hijriyah based on Tambo Kepaksian.

The district which has an area of 4,654.98 square km with a population density of around 124 people/square km began inaugurated on March 21, 1997, based on Law Number 2 of 1997, the following history of Tanggamus Lampung Regency began when it was formed.

Tourist attractions
Kiluan Bay
Gigi Hiu Beach
Tanggamus Mountain
Sawmiil Beach 
Way Lalaan Waterfall
Jarum Lebuay Waterfall
Batutegi Dam
Lembah Pelangi Waterfall

References

Regencies of Lampung